The 2021 Men's under-19 World Floorball Championships were the 11th world championships in men's under-19 floorball. The tournament took place from 25 to 29 August 2021 in Brno, Czech Republic.

The Czech team, who had also won the championship in Halifax, defended their title.

Qualification

A total of 28 teams registered for the event. The top 9 teams from the 2019 U-19 championship automatically qualified.  The remaining teams automatically qualified based on World Rankings due to the cancellation of all qualifiers by the IFF due to the COVID-19 pandemic.

In July 2021, it was announced that Australia, Canada, Japan, New Zealand, Norway, and Russia would be unable to participate, and Austria, Belgium, Estonia, Hungary, and Italy would take their place as replacement teams.

Venues

Groups
The four groups were determined by a drawing on December 16, 2020.  For the first time, all four groups will compete at the same division level.

Preliminary round

Group A

All times are local (UTC+2).

Group B

All times are local (UTC+2).

Group C

All times are local (UTC+2).

Group D

All times are local (UTC+2).

Placement round

Fifth place game

Latvia vs Germany

7th–10th place game
Bracket

Slovakia vs Estonia

Denmark vs Poland

Seventh place game

Slovakia vs Poland

Ninth place game

Estonia vs Denmark

Eleventh place game

Austria vs Slovenia

13th–15th place game
As the number of teams in Group C & D was not equal then a ‘mini-tournament’ format will be used to decide the 13th–15th placings. The placings will be calculated by using the two 13th–15th placement matches plus the result from the Group C match between the teams involved.

The matches for 13th–15th place will be played only with regular match time – 3 x 20 minutes. No extra time or penalty shots.

Knock-out stage

Bracket

Semifinals

Sweden vs Czech Republic

Finland vs Switzerland

Bronze medal game

Gold medal game

Final standings

References

External links
 Official Website

Floorball World Championships
2021 in floorball
International floorball competitions hosted by the Czech Republic
World Floorball Championships
World Floorball Championships